David Devine may refer to:

 David Devine (athlete) (born 1992), British Paralympic athlete
 David Devine (director), Canadian film director and producer
 David Devine (footballer) (born 2001), Scottish football player (Motherwell FC)